Top Chef is a Spanish television show based on the American format of the same name. The base of the program is a cooking competition that features chefs competing for the title of best chef in the country. Atresmedia produces the show for its main channel Antena 3 in association with production company Boomerang TV.

History 
In January 2013, Atresmedia confirmed it had bought the rights to adapt the Top Chef format in Spain, which rival group Mediaset España had previously discarded producing for its channel Cuatro. As the details of the adaptation were revealed, the show was initially meant to air on Atresmedia's second channel laSexta, which at the time had the success of Pesadilla en la cocina (the Spanish adaptation of the Kitchen Nightmares franchise) to its credit. However, after seeing the success of similar format MasterChef on public channel La 1, Atresmedia decided to air Top Chef on its main channel Antena 3 instead. The first season premiered on October 2, 2013.

Format 
Top Chef searches for the best professional cook in the country, who will get a cash money prize and supplies for his or her restaurant. In order to become the "top chef", contestants must face weekly challenges on each episode:
Trial by fire: A quick challenge where the contestants must prove their skills to work against the clock. The winner gets immunity and/or privileges for the next challenge.
Team challenge: The contestants are thrown into teams for an outdoor task where they will cook for a collective whose votes will decide the winning team.
Last chance: The members of the losing team in the previous task face each other with the judges of the show deciding who cooked the best plate. The loser of this challenge gets eliminated from the competition.

First season (2013) 
The first season ran from October 2 to December 18, 2013, and featured chefs Alberto Chicote, Ángel León and Susi Díaz as judges. On week 9 the eliminated contestants returned for a repechage challenge where the chefs still in contention served as judges. The special panel of judges for the finale featured Pedro Subijana, Martín Berasategui, Joan Roca, Quique Dacosta, Eneko Atxa, Juan Mari Arzak and Karlos Arguiñano.

Contestants

Weekly stats chart

Second season (2014) 
The second season premiered on September 8, 2014 and ended on December 17, 2014. Alberto Chicote and Susi Díaz returned as judges, with Yayo Daporta replacing Ángel León. On week 2 the contestants dropped on the final castings (week 1) were given another chance to earn a place on the competition against the losers of the week's team challenge, and featured again the repechage challenge, that took place on week 11. The special panel of judges for the finale featured Martín Berasategui, Pedro Larumbe, Andoni Luis Adúriz, Carles Gaig, Toño Pérez, Francis Paniego and Ángel León.

Due to an agreement with McDonald's, this season also featured a "burger challenge", which was won by Javier García Peña. As a result, his creation would be commercialized for a limited time in the Spanish McDonald's restaurants as the Grand McExtrem Top Chef.

Contestants

Weekly stats chart

Third season (2015) 
The third season ran from September 9 to December 16, 2015. Alberto Chicote and Susi Díaz continued as judges, while Paco Roncero replaced Yayo Daporta.

Contestants

Weekly stats chart

Fourth season (2017) 
This season ran from February 15 to May 17, 2017. The panel of judges from season 3 (Chicote, Díaz and Roncero) returned unchanged for this season.

Contestants

Weekly stats chart

References 

Spanish
Spanish reality television series
Antena 3 (Spanish TV channel) network series
2013 Spanish television series debuts
Spanish television series based on American television series